Pachar is a village in Bageshwar District of the Indian state of Uttrakhand. The village is about 45 kilometers from the city of Bageshwar.

Inhabitants 
It is traditionally inhabited by the Pandeys of Mandlik clan, along with Lohnis and Pants. These are Brahmin castes. Kshtriyas. mainly Chauhan, can live in a nearby village and are said to have donated this village to Brahmins. Dalits of Dom caste live in a separate area in the village. Like any typical Varna structured Kumauni village, untouchability is practiced.

Religion 
The patron deity of this village and nearby area is called Nauling delta and has a temple in Pachar.

Economy 
The main profession is agriculture and army service among Kshatriyas, priest craft, and agriculture among Brahmins and labour among Dalits (agricultural or otherwise). Mines near Khadiya supply materials used in talcum powder, paint and toothpaste. 

It has a primary school, Panchayat Ghar, and Intercollege at Saneti. Many people have migrated to Lucknow, Bareilly, Delhi and even the United States. 

According to the census in 2011, Pachar had a total 110 families. The population is 551 people. 288 males and 263 females.

References

Villages in Bageshwar district